On 24 December 2010, jihadist group Boko Haram carried out attacks in Jos and Maiduguri in Nigeria, killing 38 people. 

Four bombs exploded in Jos, Plateau State, killing 32 people: two near a large market, one in a mainly Christian area and another near a road leading to the city's main mosque. Six people were killed in attacks on two churches in Maiduguri, Borno State. 

Boko Haram claimed responsibility for all the attacks.

References

2010 murders in Nigeria
2010s in Maiduguri
2010 Maiduguri attacks
21st-century mass murder in Nigeria
Attacks on buildings and structures in 2010
Attacks on churches in Africa
Attacks on religious buildings and structures in Nigeria
Boko Haram attacks in Maiduguri 
Boko Haram bombings
2010 Maiduguri attacks
December 2010 crimes
December 2010 events in Nigeria
Improvised explosive device bombings in 2010
Improvised explosive device bombings in Maiduguri
Islamic terrorist incidents in 2010
Marketplace attacks in Nigeria
Mass murder in 2010
Mass murder in Maiduguri
Terrorist incidents in Nigeria in 2010